Barsovo is the name of several inhabited localities in Russia.

Urban localities
Barsovo, Khanty-Mansi Autonomous Okrug, an urban-type settlement in Surgutsky District of Khanty-Mansi Autonomous Okrug

Rural localities
Barsovo (railway crossing loop), Tver Oblast, a railway crossing loop in Starotoropskoye Rural Settlement of Zapadnodvinsky District in Tver Oblast
Barsovo (village), Tver Oblast, a village in Starotoropskoye Rural Settlement of Zapadnodvinsky District in Tver Oblast
Barsovo, Vladimir Oblast, a settlement in Kirzhachsky District of Vladimir Oblast